Ivan Yushkov (born 15 January 1981) is a Russian shot putter. His personal best throw is 21.01 metres, achieved in May 2008 in Sochi.

In 2016, he was disqualified from the Beijing 2008 Olympics following reanalysis of his samples from the 2008 Olympics, resulted in a positive test for the prohibited substances turinabol, oxandrolone and stanozolol. In February 2019, the Court of Arbitration for Sport handed him a four-year ban for doping, starting from 2 July 2016.

International competitions

See also
List of doping cases in athletics

References

External links
 

1981 births
Living people
Russian male shot putters
Olympic male shot putters
Olympic athletes of Russia
Athletes (track and field) at the 2004 Summer Olympics
Athletes (track and field) at the 2008 Summer Olympics
Competitors at the 2005 Summer Universiade
World Athletics Championships athletes for Russia
Russian Athletics Championships winners
Doping cases in athletics
Russian sportspeople in doping cases
21st-century Russian people